Nabi Sensoy (25 May 1945, Istanbul – 7 February 2018, İzmir, Turkey) was the ambassador of Turkey to the United States. He held that office beginning in January 2006. He was recalled to Turkey in October 2007 after the United States House Committee on Foreign Affairs passed a resolution condemning the Armenian genocide in the Ottoman Empire.  He returned to his position shortly afterwards. He resigned in December of 2009.

See also 
 List of Turkish diplomats

References

1945 births
2018 deaths
Diplomats from Istanbul
Ankara University Faculty of Political Sciences alumni
Ambassadors of Turkey to the United States
Ambassadors of Turkey to Russia
Ambassadors of Turkey to Spain
21st-century Turkish diplomats
20th-century Turkish diplomats